Thomas Cox Meech (1868 – 20 October 1940) was an English journalist, author and lawyer.

Born in Beaminster and educated at Ardingly College, Meech was initially intent on becoming a lawyer but instead turned to journalism, becoming editor of Ayrshire Post, Lancashire Daily Post and the Northern Echo.  He published his first novel Only a Collier in 1890. Other books include biographies of Thomas Burt and William McKinley and a history of the Great Britain and Ireland called This Generation (1927–28).  With Ladbroke Black he wrote several books under the pen name Paul Urquhart.

References

External links 
 Bear Alley: Paul Urquhart (Ladbroke Black & Thomas Meech) at blogspot.com

1868 births
1940 deaths
People educated at Ardingly College
English male journalists
English writers
English lawyers
People from Beaminster